My Personal Property is a 1963 album by American singer Bobby Short of songs composed by Cy Coleman.

Personnel
Bobby Short – vocals, piano
Beverly Peer – double bass
Dick Sheridan – drums (all tracks except "My Personal Property")
Gene Gammage – drums on "My Personal Property"
Valdo Ramirez, Willie Rodriguez – percussion

References

External links
 

1963 albums
Atlantic Records albums
Bobby Short albums
Tribute albums